"Here Comes My Baby" is a song co-written and recorded by American country music artist Dottie West.  It was released in June 1964 as the first single and title track from the album Here Comes My Baby.  West wrote the song with her then-husband Bill.

History
"Here Comes My Baby" was the first song to be written and made famous by Dottie West. In 1964, Dottie West was trying to make it big in Nashville. She released a single the previous year called "Let Me off at the Corner," which made the Top 40. She also recorded another with Jim Reeves called "Love Is No Excuse," which became a hit after his death in 1964. She had just received a recording contract with RCA Victor and decided that she would write her own song and release it as a single. The song was written in one day, according to West, who wrote along with her husband Bill West, and she then recorded it in Nashville.

Nobody expected the success the song would bring in 1964. The song made it to number 10 on the Billboard country charts that year, making the song a national hit for West. That year, West won a BMI award for writing "Here Comes My Baby." The next year, West made history when the song won her a Grammy for Best Female Country Vocal Performance. West not only became the first person to win this type of Grammy award, but also became the first female country music singer to ever win a Grammy award.  (The National Academy of Recording Arts and Sciences introduced the country categories to the Grammy Awards that year.)

Because of the success of the song, West got a spot on the Grand Ole Opry in Nashville, and the song became one of West's signature songs of her career. It has been made a standard to record in country music.

Cover versions
Since its original release, "Here Comes My Baby" has been recorded by over 100 artists, including Lynn Anderson from the album "Songs That Made Country Girls Famous" (1970), Dean Martin, Faron Young and a 1965 Perry Como version produced by Chet Atkins.

Charts

Anita Perras version

Canadian country music artist Anita Perras covered the song on her 1989 album Touch My Heart. Her version was released as a single in 1990 and peaked at number 9 on the RPM Country Tracks chart.

Chart performance

Year-end charts

References

1964 songs
1964 singles
1990 singles
Dottie West songs
Dean Martin songs
Anita Perras songs
RCA Records singles
Songs written by Dottie West